This is a list of notable Cameroonian actors. 

 Achille Brice
 Achiri Victor
 Alenne Menget
Chief Epey JR
 Agbor Gilbert Ebot
 Anurin Nwunembom
 Asobo De
 Babila Clovis
 Bechem Bisong BB
 Chu Eu
 Dupree Koual
 Enah Johnscott
 Epule Jeffrey
 Eriq Ebouaney
 Eystein Young Jr
 Fonde Collins
 Gerard Esomba
 Ivan Namme
 Kang Quintus
 Lynno Lovert
 Mathieu Banye Senjo
 Neba Godwill Awatu
 Nchini Justin
 Nkanya Nkwai
 Pascal Moma
 Prince Toboh Serdrick
 Seehoofer N. Roland
 Shengang R Claude
 Sumbai Ekane Epie
 Tanhoh Ramin Funwie
 Vitalis Otias
 Yannick Davidson Annoh

Actresses 
 Ade Kelly
 Adela Elad
 Alvine Diba
 Bibish Bright
 Brenda Elung
 Catherine Fri
 Charlotte Gobina
 Faith Fidel
 Gladys Ndonyi
 Joyce Bikidik
 Lina Ikechuju
 Malvis-Ann Mohvu
 Memba Lucie
 Nsang Dilong
 N Sylvia-Bright Bi
 Onyama Laura
 Onyama Laura
 Quinny Ijang
 Quinta Eyongashu
 Relindis Nchang
 Roseline Fonkwa
 Sahndra Fon Dufe
 Solange Yijika
 Syndy Emade
 Syriette Che
 Tantoh Ramin Funwie
 Wang Jenif

See also
 Cinema of Cameroon
 List of Cameroonian films
 Cameroon Film Industry

References
 

Cameroonian
Cameroonian film people